The Molopo River is one of the main rivers in Southern Africa. It has a length of approximately 960 kilometres and a catchment area of 367,201 km2 with Botswana, Namibia and South Africa sharing roughly about a third of the basin each.

Course
Its source is in the Molopo Oog (Eye of Molopo in Afrikaans), and the river generally flows first to the west, and then to the southwest from its source. In its middle course the Molopo River forms a significant section of the border between Botswana and South Africa.

River flow is intermittent and when it flows, its water flows very slowly owing to a gradient of only 0.76 m/km. Floods are rare because the vast sandveld areas of the Kalahari Desert on the Namibian side of its basin absorb all water from the seasonal rains. It is believed that this last occurred more than 100 years ago.

Tributary
The main tributary of the Molopo is the Nossob, whose confluence is some 50 km south of Twee Rivieren, at 890m above sea level. Other tributaries are:
Kuruman River
Phepane River
Ramatlabama River
Madebe River
Modimola River
Setlagoli River

Dams
The upper Molopo is part of the Crocodile (West) and Marico Water Management Area and the lower is included in the Lower Vaal Water Management Area. Major dams in the river are the Setumo Dam and the Disaneng Dam, both located near the city of Mafikeng, South Africa, which lies on the banks of the river.

See also 
 List of rivers of South Africa
List of dams and reservoirs in South Africa

References

External links

'Where is the life in farming': Agricultural livelihoods in Molopo and Barolongs compared

Rivers of Botswana
International rivers of Africa
Tributaries of the Orange River
Botswana–South Africa border
Rivers of the Northern Cape
Rivers of North West (South African province)